Culladia hanna is a moth in the family Crambidae. It was described by Stanisław Błeszyński in 1970. It is found in New Guinea, New Britain, China (Hainan), Java, Sumatra, the St Matthias Islands and the Solomon Islands.

References

Crambini
Moths described in 1970
Moths of Asia
Moths of Oceania